Alfred Ollivant (4 January 1839 – 26 May 1906) was an English cricketer. Ollivant's batting style is unknown. He was born at Manchester, Lancashire.

Ollivant made his first-class debut for Lancashire against Derbyshire in 1873 at the County Ground, Derby. He made a second first-class appearance in 1874 against the same opposition at Old Trafford. He scored a total of 36 runs from his two matches, with a high score of 24 not out.

He died at Bowdon, Cheshire, on 26 May 1906.

References

External links
Alfred Ollivant at ESPNcricinfo
Alfred Ollivant at CricketArchive

1839 births
1906 deaths
Cricketers from Manchester
English cricketers
Lancashire cricketers